Frank N. Graass was a member of the Wisconsin State Assembly.

Biography
Graass was born on August 19, 1885 in Sturgeon Bay, Wisconsin. He died on July 28, 1973 in Sturgeon Bay.

Career
Graass was a member of the Assembly on three occasions. First, from 1917 to 1919, second, from 1935 to 1942 and third, from 1951 to 1960. Additionally, he was a legislative and financial secretary for Governor Walter Samuel Goodland. He was a Republican.

References

People from Sturgeon Bay, Wisconsin
Republican Party members of the Wisconsin State Assembly
1885 births
1973 deaths
20th-century American politicians